Shuleichthys brachypteryx is an extinct species of ray-finned fish which existed in China during the Cretaceous period. Fossils of the fish were found in the Aptian Xiagou Formation of the Changma Basin. It is the only species in the genus Shuleichthys and cannot be placed in any order of the Osteoglossomorpha without making that order paraphyletic.

References 

Teleostei
Ray-finned fish enigmatic taxa
Prehistoric ray-finned fish genera
Cretaceous bony fish
Aptian life
Early Cretaceous vertebrates of Asia
Fossils of China
Fossil taxa described in 2010